The Betts–Longworth Historic District is located just northwest of downtown Cincinnati, Ohio. The district consists of a ten-block sub-neighborhood of the historic West End of Cincinnati that contains Federal, Italianate and Queen Anne styles. The Betts House located at 416 Clark Street was built in 1804 and is the oldest brick house in Ohio. The Old Jewish Cemetery, Cincinnati is also located in the district.

The district was listed on the National Register of Historic Places in 1983 because of its architecture and because of a potential archaeological site within its boundaries.

References

External links
Map of the Betts–Longworth Historic District
Betts–Longworth Historic District
Betts House Picture Gallery

Archaeological sites in Ohio
National Register of Historic Places in Hamilton County, Ohio
Queen Anne architecture in Ohio
Federal architecture in Ohio
Italianate architecture in Ohio
Historic districts in Cincinnati
Historic districts on the National Register of Historic Places in Ohio
West End, Cincinnati